Against the Law is a 1950 Italian crime film directed by Flavio Calzavara and starring Marcello Mastroianni, Fulvia Mammi and Renato Malavasi.

The film's sets were designed by the art director Virgilio Marchi.

Plot 
Marcello Curti is a young man who is part of a middle-class family. In spite of his appearances, however, he conducts trafficking in dirty money by acting as an intermediary between the large foreign mafia clans and his fellow villagers.

During his usual bargaining, a fight breaks out between the two sides and the buyer of US dollars is fatally wounded by a gunshot. Immediately after the fight, the police are called and the killer manages to escape, leaving Curti alone with the body.

The young man is therefore accused of manslaughter, and therefore begins a long series of interrogations administered by the police inspector and the sergeant. Although the evidence seems overwhelming, the police inspector is convinced that the young Curti is not the perpetrator, so he leaves him on parole; later, however, he has him tailed to control all the boy's movements.

In the meantime, however, Marcello Curti begins his own investigation to search for the real killer, helped by his faithful girlfriend. Determined to take justice by himself, the young Curti arrives on the trail of the murderer, thanks to a detail found on the corpse previously analyzed.

In the end, a fight takes place between Marcello Curti and the murderer, named Alfredo; following a ferocious chase, Curti manages to kill the culprit. Meanwhile, the police station had followed the whole affair, intervening in the middle of the final confrontation. The young Curti therefore manages to prove his innocence before the court and can thus begin to live peacefully again, no longer having to deal with the trafficking that previously saw him as a protagonist.

Cast
 Marcello Mastroianni as Marcello Curti
 Fulvia Mammi as Maria
 Renato Malavasi as Peppino
 Tino Buazzelli as Inspector
 Manlio Busoni as Sergeant
 Miranda Campa as Miss Curti
  as Grigio
 Paolo Panelli as Tremolino
 Mario Terribile as Bird salesman
 Maria Teresa Albani
 Gianni Bonagura
 Orazio Costa
 Pia De Doses
 Angelo Dessy
 Attilio Dottesio

References

Bibliography

External links

1950 films
1950 crime films
1950s Italian-language films
Italian black-and-white films
Films directed by Flavio Calzavara
Italian crime films
1950s Italian films